Rene Maurin (born 1971, in Maribor, Slovenia) is a Slovene theatre director, film director and screenwriter.

Biography
During his studies of architecture in Graz, Austria he became interested in theatre and film. Leaving architecture studies he enrolled the Academy of Drama Arts in Zagreb, Croatia, where he finishes the studies under the mentorship of Georgij Paro and Tomislav Durbešić. He graduated with the first staging of the play IT, by a young Slovene author Rok Vilčnik, which was awarded for the Best new Slovene play at the Week of Slovenian Drama in the year 2000.

After the graduation he focused primarily on documentary and semi-documentary film in the production of Radio-Television Slovenia. In 2001 he took over the artistic leadership of Ptuj City Theatre which he led until 2008. Notably, in his mandate the neoclassical theatre building was completely renovated after almost hundred years.

In 2015 he obtains a MA degree in film studies at the Academy of Theatre, Radio, Film and Television (Ljubljana), following the production of the short feature film Bright Black. As of 2012 he is a guest professor at the Institute for Media communication at University of Maribor in Slovenia and writes for several newspapers and magazines.

He lives in Maribor and Ljubljana, Slovenia and directs mostly in Slovenia and Croatia.

Works

Theatre
T. Kacarov, In Only a Day, Croatian National Theatre, Varaždin, Croatia 
Richard Tognetti, Nothing Project, Festival Maribor, Slovenia 
M. Krleža, Golgotha - Requiem for social justice, Theatre Virovitica, Croatia 
D. Harrower, Blackbird, Imaginarni in coproduction with Cankar Hall, Ljubljana, Slovenia 
P. A. C. de Beaumarchais, The Barber of Seville, Croatian National Theatre, Split, Croatia 
T. Williams, The Two Character Play, Ptuj City Theatre, Ptuj, Slovenia 
R. Maurin, General Maister, Protocol of Republic Slovenia, Lenart, Slovenia
R. Vilčnik, A. T. Linhart Micka, Ptuj City Theatre, Ptuj, Slovenia 
P. Svetina The Walrus gets glasses, Maribor Puppet Theatre, Maribor, Slovenia
S. Grum, The Event In Town of Goga, Croatian National Theatre, Osijek, Croatia
P. Vogel, Desdemona, A Play about a Handkerchief, Croatian National Theatre, Osijek, Croatia
A. Schnitzler, Café amoral (La Ronde), Ptuj City Theatre, Ptuj, Slovenia 
J. P. Sartre, No Exit, HKD Theatre, Rijeka, Croatia 
L. Hübner, Creeps, Ptuj City Theatre, Ptuj, Slovenia 
R. Vilčnik, Anteater or The Forest of Red Fruit, ITI Center, Motovun, Croatia
group of authors, In My Shoes, First Stage, First Gymnasium, Maribor, Slovenia
R. Vilčnik, TO, Slovene National Theatre, Maribor, Slovenia
R. Maurin, Audiction, Intercontinental, Zagreb, Croatia
F. Arrabal, The Tricycle, Academy of Drama Arts, Zagreb, Croatia
H. Pinter, The Dumb Waiter, Academy of Drama Arts, Zagreb, Croatia
H. Barker, Art for sale (The Possibilities), Academy of Drama Arts, Zagreb, Croatia

Film
R. Maurin, Bright Black, short feature film, AGRFT Ljubljana 
G. Trušnovec, Caliber 0.46, Radio-Television Slovenia
R. Maurin, G. Trušnovec Suma sumarum, Radio-Television Slovenia
R. Maurin, S. Pečovnik, Life As From Inside, Radio-Television Slovenia
R. Maurin, I Saw Elvis!,  Radio-Television Slovenia
R. Maurin, JUNKARt,  Radio-Television Slovenia

Radio
J. Sigsgard, Robin Hood, a cartoon for the ears, Croatian Radio Television, Zagreb, Croatia
W. Bauer, Dreamjockey, Croatian Radio Television, Zagreb, Croatia

Translations

T. Williams, The Two Character Play 
A. Ayckbourn, Callisto #7

Awards

Prešern Prize, University of Ljubljana 
Golden Laugh, 31st International Days of Satire, Zagreb, Croatia
Prix Fabijan Šovagović, 13th Actors Festival, Vinkovci, Croatia
Golden Lion, 6th International International Festival of Small Stages , Umag, Croatia 
Golden Laugh, 29th International Days of Satire, Zagreb, Croatia

References

External links

Ptuj City Theatre, Slovenia 
HKD Theatre, Rijeka, Croatia 
Slobodna Dalmacija  Interview
Vjesnik  Interview
Rene Maurin, listing in the Slovene National film fund database
Vest  Interview on Vest
Radio 101  Review on Radio 101
DokMa  Listing at DokMa film festival

Slovenian theatre directors
Slovenian film directors
Writers from Maribor
1971 births
Living people
University of Graz alumni
Academy of Dramatic Art, University of Zagreb alumni
University of Ljubljana alumni